The Churchills was one of the first Israeli rock bands, formed by Yitzhak Klepter.

History
The Churchills was founded in 1965. The band played rock music in English, from psychedelic rock to hard rock and progressive rock. Outside of Israel, it was active under the aliases of Jericho Jones and Jericho. 

The band was a leading force in the early Israeli beat scene, but it was its cooperation with Arik Einstein that helped it cross over to the mainstream of Israeli pop and gain recognition. It began when the Churchills were invited to work with Einstein on his third solo album Poozy, recorded in 1969. This is considered by many to be the first rock album in Hebrew. The Churchills played on half of the tracks in that album, one of which was a Hebrew version of one of their own songs ("When You're Gone"). Following Poozy, the Churchills also played with Einstein in his gigs, and continued to play and produce three more albums with Einstein: Shablul (1970), Plastelina (1970) and On Avigdor's Grass (1971). 

Contributing to the Churchills' sound at the time was the joining of two foreign members: Canadian vocalist Stan Solomon and British guitarist Robb Huxley (formerly with The Tornados).

The A-side of their last single, Time is Now, was written by Ray Dorset, who included his own version on his solo album Cold Blue Excursion.

Band members
 First Ensemble (1965–1967)
 Yitzhak Klepter – Guitar
 Miki Gavrielov – Bass Guitar
 Haim Romano – Guitar
 Selwyn Lifshitz – Vocals
 Ami Traibetch – Drums
 Second Ensemble (1968–1969)
 Robb Huxley – Guitar, Vocals
 Miki Gavrielov – Bass
 Haim Romano – Guitar
 Stan Solomon – Vocals
 Ami Traibetch – Drums
 Third Ensemble (1969–1972)
 Robb Huxley – Guitar, Vocals
 Miki Gavrielov – Bass
 Haim Romano – Guitar
 Dani Shoshan – Vocals
 Ami Traibetch – Drums
 Fourth Ensemble (1972–1973)
 Robb Huxley – Guitar, Vocals
 Haim Romano – Lead Guitar
 Danny Shoshan – Bass, Lead Vocals
 Chris Perry – Drums
 Fifth Ensemble (1972–1973) (as The New Churchills)
 Miki Gavrielov – Bass
 Roni Demol – Guitar
 Shmulik Bodgov – Guitar
 Ami Traibetch – Drums

Discography

Albums
 1968 Cherchilim (צ'רצ'ילים, "Churchill's") - Tracks: "Open Up Your Eyes"/"Song From The Sea"/"Pictures in my Mind"/"Comics"/"When You're Gone"/"Strangulation"/"Straight People"/"Subsequent Finale"/"So Alone Today"/"Debka"
 1971 As Jericho Jones: Junkies, Monkeys and Donkeys - Tracks: Mare Tranquilitatas / Man in the Crowd / There Is Always a Train/ Yellow and Blue / Freedom / Trangulum / No School to Day / Junkies Monkeys & Donkeys / What Have We Got to Lose / Mama's Gonna Take You Home  
 1972 As Jericho: Jericho - Tracks: "Ethiopia"/"Don't You Let Me Down"/"Featherbed"/"Justin And Nova"/"Kill Me With Your Love"

Singles
 1968 "Too Much In Love To Hear" (Gale/Holder)/"Talk To Me" (A-side first recorded by The Tornados)
 1970 Churchill Sebastian Bach: Coral for Young Lovers/Double Concerto (צ'רצ'יל סבסטיאן באך: קוראל לאוהבים הצעירים/קונצ'רטו כפול)
 1970 "Signs of You"/"Living Loving"
 1970 "She's a Woman"/"Sunshine Man"
 1971 "Time is Now"/"Freedom"
 2021 "Dangerous People"

Collaborations
 1969 Arik Einstein – Poozy
 1970 Arik Einstein & Shalom Hanoch – Shablul
 1970 Arik Einstein & Shalom Hanoch – Plastelina
 1970 Oshik Levi – Kzat Sheket
 1971 Pupik Arnon – Kol Ehad
 1971 Arik Einstein & Robb Huxley – Shirei Yeladim
 1971 Arik Einstein & Miki Gavrielov – BaDeshe Etzel Avigdor
 1973 Arik Einstein – Eretz Israel HaYeshana VeHaTova

References

External Links
 
 
 Richard Klin: "Israeli Gears." https://www.jewishviews.com/israeli-gears/

Israeli rock music groups
Musical groups established in 1965
Musical groups disestablished in 1973
1965 establishments in Israel
1973 disestablishments in Israel
Beat groups